Georgios Sougdouris (1645/7–1725) was a Greek philosopher and theologian.

Biography
Sougdouris was born in Ioannina, northwestern Greece, where he finished ground level studies. He continued his studies at the University of Venice and in Padua where he may have attended courses at the local university. Gioumeios or Gioumas School), succeeding Bessarion Makris. Sougdouris taught there natural science, mathematics and aristotelian philosophy. Sougdouris taught at the Goumas school until 1710 and was succeeded by Methodios Anthrakites. He wrote a number of philological, theological and philosophical works like Εισαγωγή Λογική (Introduction to Logic), published in Vienna, 1792 and Επιτομή Γραμματικής (Concise Grammar), both were extensively used as school textbooks. Moreover, he translated to Greek the work of Francesco Panigarola Rhetorica Ecclesiastica.

Sougdouris got involved in various theological discussions with local scholars. Due to his progressive views and teaching methods, got into conflict with conservatives cycles and was accused for atheism. As a result, the local Orthodox bishop asked for Sougdouris' excommunication but failed.

References

1645 births
1647 births
1725 deaths
17th-century Greek people
18th-century Greek people
People of the Modern Greek Enlightenment
Greeks from the Ottoman Empire
Greek logicians
Writers from Ioannina
Greek philosophers
Ca' Foscari University of Venice alumni
University of Padua alumni
Latin–Greek translators
Textbook writers
18th-century linguists
Linguists from Greece
Ottoman Ioannina
17th-century Greek writers
17th-century Greek philosophers
17th-century Greek educators
17th-century Greek scientists
18th-century Greek writers
18th-century Greek philosophers
18th-century Greek educators
18th-century Greek scientists